The molecular formula C14H16N2O6S3 (molar mass: 404.48 g/mol) may refer to:

 Aldesulfone sodium
 Sulfoxone

Molecular formulas